Dorothy Joan Harris (born February 14, 1931) is a Japanese-born Canadian writer living in Toronto, Ontario, Canada. She mainly writes children's books.

Biography
The daughter of Hubert and Alice Langley, she was born Dorothy Joan Langley in Kobe and came with her family to St. Catharines, Ontario, in 1938. She received a degree in modern languages from the University of Toronto in 1952 and went on to teach elementary school in France and Japan. She returned to Toronto in 1954 and married Alan Harris in 1955; the couple had two children. From 1955 to 1961, Harris was an editor for Copp Clark Publishers. From 1977 to 1996, she was a public library assistant.

She contributed to the 1999 anthology Too Young to Fight: Memories from our Youth During World War, which received the BolognaRagazzi Award at the Bologna Children's Book Fair. Her 2004 book A very unusual dog was nominated for a Chocolate Lily Award.

Selected works 
 The House Mouse, picture book (1973), Japan,
 The School Mouse, picture book (1977)
 Don't Call Me Sugarbaby!, informational novel (1983), diabetes, also available in Braille
 Even If It Kills Me, informational novel (1987), anorexia nervosa
 Four Seasons for Toby, picture book (1987), translated into French as Theo et les Quatre Saisons
 Speedy Sam, young reader (1989), translated into French as Cleo la Souris Expres
 No Dinosaurs in the Park, picture book (1990), translated into French as Pas de Dinosaurs dans le parc
 Annabel the Detective: The Case of the Missing Tooth, young reader (1991)
 Ellen: the wishing time (2004), part of the Our Canadian Girl: Ellen series
 A Very Unusual Dog (2004), Markham, ON: North Winds Press

References 

1931 births
Living people
Canadian children's writers
University of Toronto alumni
20th-century Canadian women writers
21st-century Canadian women writers